The Rural Municipality of Cymri No. 36 is a rural municipality (RM) in the Canadian province of Saskatchewan within Census Division No. 2 and  Division No. 1. It is located in the southeast portion of the province.

History 
The RM of Cymri No. 36 incorporated as a rural municipality on December 13, 1909.

Heritage properties
There is one historical property located within the RM.

Steven Peterson Residence - Constructed in 1916 as the Gustav Peterson Residence, in Halbrite. The residence also functioned as a community meeting place.

Geography

Communities and localities 
The following urban municipalities are surrounded by the RM.

Towns
 Midale

Villages
 Halbrite
 Macoun

The following unincorporated communities are within the RM.

Localities
 Blewett

Demographics 

Attractions 
The RM includes the Mainprize Regional Park.

Government 
The RM of Cymri No. 36 is governed by an elected municipal council and an appointed administrator that meets on the second Thursday of every month. The reeve of the RM is Joe Vilcu while its administrator is Sarah Leck. The RM's office is located in Midale.

References 

C

Division No. 2, Saskatchewan